The Collection of Swiss Law Sources (Sammlung Schweizerischer Rechtsquellen in German; Collection des sources du droit suisse in French; Collana Fonti del diritto svizzero in Italian) is a collection of critical editions of historical legal documents (regarded as sources of law) created on Swiss territory from the early Middle Ages up to 1798.

It is edited by the Law Sources Foundation of the Swiss Lawyers Society.  The Law Sources Foundation was established in 1894 (then
called Law Sources Commission) for this purpose.

Since then, over 100 volumes (80,000+ pages) of source material (e.g.,
statutes, decrees, or regulations, but also administrative documents
and court transcripts) from the early Middle Ages until early modern
times have been published in the form of source editions.

The primary sources are manuscripts written in various regional
historical forms of German, French, Italian, Rhaeto-Romance languages, and Latin, which were transcribed (using diplomatic transcription, annotated, and commented by the
editors.  The apparatuses are in modern German, French, or Italian.
The goal of the Collection is to make the sources available to
historians of law, law researchers, historians in general, as well as
to researchers from other fields and interested laypeople.  Most of
the older volumes only have a single general index, containing
persons, places, and general terms; newer volumes usually have a separate
index of persons and places.

The Collection is organized by modern cantons, with further
subdivisions by historical areas of jurisdiction, such as towns or bailiwicks.

At the moment, the Collection of Swiss Law Sources covers 22 of the 26
Swiss cantons to different extents.  The edition of the Collection is
an ongoing project and further volumes are in preparation.  The Foundation receives funding from the Swiss National Science Foundation, the Friedrich-Emil-Welti-Fonds, individual cantons, and other sources (e.g., municipalities).

Since 2018, the digitally compiled editions (XML/TEI) have been freely available online in the portal of the Collection of Swiss Law Sources online. On 1 May 2020, the Legal Sources Foundation founded the association e-editiones together with other editing companies in order to jointly develop the publication tool TEI Publisher, among other things.

Presidents 
 1894–1921 Andreas Heusler
 1921–1935 Walther Merz
 1935–1960 Hermann Rennefahrt
 1960–1966 Jacob Wackernagel
 1966–1988 Hans Herold
 1988–2006 Claudio Soliva
 seit 2006 Lukas Gschwend

References 

 Peter Blickle:  Ordnung schaffen. Alteuropäische Rechtskultur in der Schweiz. Eine monumentale Edition. In: Historische Zeitschrift. Bd. 268, 1999, S. 121–136.
 Lukas Gschwend: Die Sammlung Schweizerischer Rechtsquellen, herausgegeben von der Rechtsquellenstiftung des Schweizerischen Juristenvereins: Ein Monumentalwerk rechtshistorischer Grundlagenforschung. In: Zeitschrift für Schweizerisches Recht. Bd. 126/1, 2007, S. 435–457.
 Lukas Gschwend: Rechtshistorische Grundlagenforschung: Die Sammlung Schweizerischer Rechtsquellen. In: Schweizerische Zeitschrift für Geschichte. Bd. 58/1, 2008, S. 4–19.
 Lukas Gschwend, Pascale Sutter: Die Sammlung Schweizerischer Rechtsquellen und ihr Rechtsquellenbegriff. In: Rechtskultur 2 – Zeitschrift für Europäische Rechtsgeschichte (Heft 2): Methoden der Rechtsgeschichte und ihrer Nachbarwissenschaften im Umgang mit rechtshistorischen Quellen. 2013, S. 67–78.
 Adrien Wyssbrod: La collection des sources du droit suisse à l’ère numérique, un outil formidable. In: Marco Cavina (Hrsg.): L’insegnamento del diritto (secoli XII–XX) – L’enseignement du droit (XXIIe–XXe siècle). Bologna 2019, S. 194–205.

External links 
 Law Sources Foundation of the Swiss Lawyers Society
 SSRQ online
 Collection of Swiss Law Sources online Collection of Swiss Law Sources online

Medieval legal texts
Textual criticism
Legal history of Switzerland